Mrčevo is a small village in the municipality of Pljevlja, Montenegro.

Demographics
According to the 2003 census, the village had a population of 16 people.

References

Populated places in Pljevlja Municipality